Peggy Allenby (February 1, 1896 – March 23, 1966) was an American stage, film, television, and radio actress.

Early life
Allenby was born Eleanor Byrne Fox in New York City and attended the Convent of the Sacred Heart. She entered theatrical work in Nashville.

Career

Television
Allenby may be best known for her role as "Mattie Lane Grimsley" on the CBS-TV soap opera Edge of Night. Peggy Allenby was in the show's cast from 1956-66. She also appeared on Cosmopolitan Theater (1951), The Philco Television Playhouse (1951), First Love (1954), Studio One (1954) and The United States Steel Hour (1959).

Radio
From 1930 to 1950, her voice was a part of such radio broadcasts as Second Husband, Young Doctor Malone, David Harum and Road of Life. She had the role of Mrs. Brown, mother of the title character on the comedy serial Claudia, based on the character created by author Rose Franken, and she played the mother in The Nichols Family. Allenby had the title role in Phyl Coe Radio Mysteries.

Theater
In 1948, she appeared in The Happy Journey to Trenton and Camden on Broadway.  Soon after, she replaced Mildred Dunnock, as Willy Loman's wife, in the 1949 production of Death of a Salesman.

Personal life and death
Allenby was married to actors John McGovern and Robert Armstrong. Her marriage with John McGovern produced two children, John Jr. and Eleanor. She died in 1966 in Park West Hospital after a short illness, aged 70.

References

External links

Peggy Allenby(NY Public Library, Billy Rose collection)

Actresses from New York City
American radio actresses
American silent film actresses
American soap opera actresses
American television actresses
American stage actresses
20th-century American actresses